Test cricket is the oldest form of cricket played at international level. A Test match is scheduled to take place over a period of five days, and is played by teams representing full member nations of the International Cricket Council (ICC).
This is a list of Indian Cricket team's Test Cricket records. It is based on the List of Test cricket records, but concentrates solely on records dealing with the Indian cricket team. India was granted Test status in 1932 to be the sixth nation to play test cricket.

Key
The top five records are listed for each category, except for the team wins, losses, draws and ties and the partnership records. Tied records for fifth place are also included. Explanations of the general symbols and cricketing terms used in the list are given below. Specific details are provided in each category where appropriate. All records include matches played for India only, and are correct .

Team records

Overall Record

Team wins, losses, draws and ties 
, India played 566 Test matches resulting in 172 victories, 174 defeats, 220 draws and 1 tie for an overall winning percentage of 30.38.

First Test series wins

First Test match wins

Team scoring records

Most runs in an innings
The highest innings total scored in Test cricket came in the series between Sri Lanka and India in August 1997. Playing in the first Test at R. Premadasa Stadium in Colombo, the hosts posted a first innings total of 6/952d. This broke the longstanding record of 7/903d which England set against Australia in the final Test of the 1938 Ashes series at The Oval. The fifth and last Test of the 2016–17 series against the England saw India set their highest innings total of 759/7d.

Highest successful run chases
India's highest fourth-innings total is 445 all out in an unsuccessful run chase against Australia at Adelaide in January 1978. Australia had set a target of 493. India's second-highest fourth-innings total of 429/8 came against England at The Oval in 1979. Having been set a target of 438 runs, India required 9 runs to win with 2 wickets in hand when the fifth day's play ended resulting in a draw. India's highest successful run chase occurred against the West Indies at Port of Spain in 1976 and is also their third-highest fourth-innings total. West Indies had set India a target of 403.

Fewest runs in an innings
The lowest score in Test history for India is 36 scored in their second innings against Australia in the first Test of the 2020 Australian tour.

Most runs conceded in an innings
The highest innings total scored against India is by Sri Lanka when they scored 952/6d in the first Test of the Indian's tour of Sri Lanka in 1997 at R. Premadasa Stadium.

Fewest runs conceded in an innings
The lowest innings total scored against India is 62 in the second test of New Zealand's tour of India in 2021

Result records
A Test match is won when one side has scored more runs than the total runs scored by the opposing side during their two innings. If both sides have completed both their allocated innings and the side that fielded last has the higher aggregate of runs, it is known as a win by runs. This indicates the number of runs that they had scored more than the opposing side. If one side scores more runs in a single innings than the total runs scored by the other side in both their innings, it is known as a win by innings and runs. If the side batting last wins the match, it is known as a win by wickets, indicating the number of wickets that were still to fall.

Greatest win margins (by innings)
The fifth Test of the 1938 Ashes series at The Oval saw England win by an innings and 579 runs, the largest victory by an innings in Test cricket history. The largest victory for India, which is the 12th largest, is their win against West Indies in the first Test of the 2018–19 tour at the Saurashtra Cricket Association Stadium, where the hosts won by an innings and 272 runs.

Greatest win margins (by runs)
The greatest winning margin by runs in Test cricket was England's victory over Australia by 675 runs in the first Test of the 1928–29 Ashes series. The largest victory recorded by India, which is the 20th largest victory, is the final Test of New Zealand's 2021 tour of India by 372 runs.

Greatest win margins (by 10 wickets)
India have won a Test match by a margin of 10 wickets on 8 occasions.

Narrowest win margins (by runs)
India's narrowest win by runs was against Australia in the fourth Test of the 2004 Border-Gavaskar Trophy at Wankhede Stadium. Set 107 runs for victory in the final innings, Australia were bowled all out for 93 to give victory to India by thirteen runs. This was the equal sixteen-narrowest win in Test cricket, with the narrowest being the West Indies' one-run win over Australia in 1993.

Narrowest win margins (by wickets)

India's narrowest win by wickets came in the first Test of the Border-Gavaskar Trophy in October 2010. Played at the PCA Stadium, the hosts won the match by a margin of one wicket, one of only fourteen one-wicket victories in Test cricket.

Greatest loss margins (by innings)
The Oval in London played host the greatest defeat by an innings in Test cricket. The final Test of the 1938 Ashes saw England defeat the tourists by an innings and 579 runs, to the draw the series at one match all. India's biggest defeat came at home during the West Indies tour in 1958 when they lost by an innings and 336 runs at Eden Gardens, Kolkata.

Greatest loss margins (by runs)
The first Test of the 1928–29 Ashes series saw Australia defeated by England by 675 runs, the greatest losing margin by runs in Test cricket. India's biggest defeat by runs was against Australia in the third Test of the 2004 Border-Gavaskar Trophy at VCA Stadium after which not only did India loose the match, they lost the series as well, making it Australia's first series win on Indian soil since their 1969-70 tour.

Greatest loss margins (by 10 wickets)
India have lost a Test match by a margin of 10 wickets on 18 occasions with most recent being during the 2nd test of the India's tour of New Zealand in 2020.

Narrowest loss margins (by runs)
The narrowest loss of India in terms of runs is by 12 runs against Pakistan in the first test of the Pakistan's tour of India in 1999.

Narrowest loss margins (by wickets)
The narrowest loss of India in terms of wickets is by 2 wickets against Australia in the second test of India's tour of Australia in 1978-79.

Tied matches 
A tie can occur when the scores of both teams are equal at the conclusion of play, provided that the side batting last has completed their innings. Only two matches have ended in a tie in Test cricket history, both of which involved Australia.

Batting records

Most career runs 
A run is the basic means of scoring in cricket. Alternatively, a player can score multiple runs by hitting the aforementioned ball out of the boundary rope for 4 or 6 runs.
India's Sachin Tendulkar has scored the most runs in Test cricket with 15,921. Second is Ricky Ponting of Australia with 13,378 ahead of Jacques Kallis from South Africa in third with 13,289. Rahul Dravid and Sunil Gavaskar are the only other Indian batsmen who have scored more than 10,000 runs in Test cricket.

Most career runs as captain

Fastest runs getter

Most runs in each batting position

Most runs against each team

Highest individual score 
The first test of the South Africa's tour of India in 2008 saw Virender Sehwag score his second triple century and record India's highest Individual score.

Highest individual score – progression of record

Highest individual score against each team

Highest career average 
A batsman's batting average is the total number of runs they have scored divided by the number of times they have been dismissed.

Highest Average in each batting position

Most half-centuries 
A half-century is a score of between 50 and 99 runs. Statistically, once a batsman's score reaches 100, it is no longer considered a half-century but a century.

Sachin Tendulkar of India has scored the most half-centuries in Test cricket with 68. He is followed by the West Indies' Shivnarine Chanderpaul on 66, India's Rahul Dravid and Allan Border of Australia on 63 and in fifth with 62 fifties to his name, Australia's Ricky Ponting.

Most centuries 
A century is a score of 100 or more runs in a single innings.

Tendulkar has also scored the most centuries in Test cricket with 51. South Africa's Jacques Kallis is next on 45 and Ricky Ponting with 41 hundreds is in third.

Most double centuries 
A double century is a score of 200 or more runs in a single innings.

For the most double centuries, Don Bradman holds the Test record scored with twelve, one ahead of Sri Lanka's Kumar Sangakkara who finished his career with eleven. In third is Brian Lara of the West Indies with nine. India's Virat Kohli is one of three cricketers who reached the mark on seven occasions.

Most triple centuries 
A triple century is a score of 300 or more runs in a single innings.

Sehwag holds the equal Test record for the most triple centuries scored with two, along with Australia's Don Bradman and West Indians Chris Gayle and Brian Lara. Karun Nair is the only other Indian who has scored a single Test triple century .

Most Sixes

Most Fours

Highest batting strike rate

Most runs in a series 
The 1930 Ashes series in England saw Don Bradman set the record for the most runs scored in a single series, falling just 26 short of 1,000 runs. He is followed by Wally Hammond with 905 runs scored in the 1928–29 Ashes series. Sunil Gavaskar with 774 in the 1971 tour of West Indies is the highest Indian on the list.

Most ducks 
A duck refers to a batsman being dismissed without scoring a run. Ishant Sharma has scored the joint fifth-highest number of ducks in Test cricket.

Bowling records

Most career wickets 
A bowler takes the wicket of a batsman when the form of dismissal is bowled, caught, leg before wicket, stumped or hit wicket. If the batsman is dismissed by run out, obstructing the field, handling the ball, hitting the ball twice or timed out the bowler does not receive credit.

Shane Warne held the record for the most Test wickets with 708 until December 2007 when Sri Lankan bowler Muttiah Muralitharan passed Warne's milestone. Muralitharan, who continued to play until 2010, finished with 800 wickets to his name. James Anderson of England is third on the list taking 675 wickets holds the record for most wickets by a fast bowler in Test cricket.
India's Anil Kumble is fourth on the list and the highest ranked Indian bowler taking 619 wickets.

Most wickets against each team

Fastest wicket taker

Best figures in an innings 

Bowling figures refers to the number of the wickets a bowler has taken and the number of runs conceded.
There have been three occasions in Test cricket where a bowler has taken all ten wickets in a single innings – Jim Laker of England took 10/53 against Australia in 1956 , India's Anil Kumble in 1999 returned figures of 10/74 against Pakistan , New Zealand's Ajaz Patel in 2021 obtained figures of 10/119 against India. Subhash Gupte, Jasu Patel and Kapil Dev are three Indian bowlers of 15 bowlers who have taken nine wickets in a Test match innings.

Best bowling figures against each team

Best figures in a match 
A bowler's bowling figures in a match is the sum of the wickets taken and the runs conceded over both innings.

No bowler in the history of Test cricket has taken all 20 wickets in a match. The closest to do so was English spin bowler Jim Laker. During the fourth Test of the 1956 Ashes series, Laker took 9/37 in the first innings and 10/53 in the second to finish with match figures of 19/90. 
Narendra Hirwani's figures of 16/136, taken in his debut test, during the fourth match of the West Indies tour of India in 1987, is the third-best in Test cricket history.

Best career average 
A bowler's bowling average is the total number of runs they have conceded divided by the number of wickets they have taken.
Nineteenth century English medium pacer George Lohmann holds the record for the best career average in Test cricket with 10.75. J. J. Ferris, one of fifteen cricketers to have played Test cricket for more than one team, is second behind Lohmann with an overall career average of 12.70 runs per wicket.

Best career economy rate 
A bowler's economy rate is the total number of runs they have conceded divided by the number of overs they have bowled.
English bowler William Attewell, who played 10 matches for England between 1884 and 1892, holds the Test record for the best career economy rate with 1.31. India's Bapu Nadkarni, with a rate of 1.67 runs per over conceded over his 41-match Test career, is fourth on the list.

Best career strike rate 
A bowler's strike rate is the total number of balls they have bowled divided by the number of wickets they have taken.
As with the career average above, the top bowler with the best Test career strike rate is George Lohmann with strike rate of 34.1 balls per wicket. India's Mohammed Shami is the highest-ranked Indian bowler on this list.

Most five-wicket hauls in an innings 
A five-wicket haul refers to a bowler taking five wickets in a single innings.
Anil Kumble is fourth on the list of most five-wicket hauls behind Sri Lanka's Muttiah Muralitharan, Australia's Shane Warne and New Zealand's Richard Hadlee in Test cricket.

Most ten-wicket hauls in a match 
A ten-wicket haul refers to a bowler taking ten or more wickets in a match over two innings.
As with the five-wicket hauls above, Anil Kumble is not only behind Muralitharan, Warne and Hadlee, he is also behind Rangana Herath of Sri Lanka in taking the most ten-wicket hauls in Test cricket.

Worst figures in an innings 
The worst figures in a single innings in Test cricket came in the third Test between the West Indies at home to Pakistan in 1958. Pakistan's Khan Mohammad returned figures of 0/259 from his 54 overs in the second innings of the match. The worst figures by an Indian is 0/187 that came off the bowling of E. A. S. Prasanna in the first test of the India's tour of England in 1967.

Worst figures in a match 
The worst figures in a match in Test cricket were taken by South Africa's Imran Tahir in the second Test against Australia at the Adelaide Oval in November 2012. He returned figures of 0/180 from his 23 overs in the first innings and 0/80 off 14 in the third innings for a total of 0/260 from 37 overs. He claimed the record in his final over when two runs came from it – enough for him to pass the previous record of 0/259, set 54 years prior.

The worst figures by an Indian is by E. A. S. Prasanna in the first test of the India's tour of England in 1967.

Most wickets in a series 
England's seventh Test tour of South Africa in 1913–14 saw the record set for the most wickets taken by a bowler in a Test series. English paceman Sydney Barnes played in four of the five matches and achieved a total of 49 wickets to his name. India's B. S. Chandrasekhar is joint 18th with his 35 wickets taken against England during the 1972–73 tour.

Hat-trick 
In cricket, a hat-trick occurs when a bowler takes three wickets with consecutive deliveries. The deliveries may be interrupted by an over bowled by another bowler from the other end of the pitch or the other team's innings, but must be three consecutive deliveries by the individual bowler in the same match. Only wickets attributed to the bowler count towards a hat-trick; run outs do not count.
In Test cricket history there have been just 44 hat-tricks, the first achieved by Fred Spofforth for Australia against England in 1879. In 1912, Australian Jimmy Matthews achieved the feat twice in one game against South Africa. The only other players to achieve two hat-tricks are Australia's Hugh Trumble, against England in 1902 and 1904, Pakistan's Wasim Akram, in separate games against Sri Lanka in 1999, and England's Stuart Broad.

Wicket-keeping records
The wicket-keeper is a specialist fielder who stands behind the stumps being guarded by the batsman on strike and is the only member of the fielding side allowed to wear gloves and leg pads.

Most career dismissals 
A wicket-keeper can be credited with the dismissal of a batsman in two ways, caught or stumped. A fair catch is taken when the ball is caught fully within the field of play without it bouncing after the ball has touched the striker's bat or glove holding the bat, while a stumping occurs when the wicket-keeper puts down the wicket while the batsman is out of his ground and not attempting a run.
India's MS Dhoni is fifth in taking most dismissals in Test cricket as a designated wicket-keeper.

Most career catches 
Dhoni is seventh in taking most catches in Test cricket as a designated wicket-keeper.

Most career stumpings 
Bert Oldfield, Australia's fifth-most capped wicket-keeper, holds the record for the most stumpings in Test cricket with 52. Indian glovemen Syed Kirmani and MS Dhoni are both equal third on 38.

Most dismissals in an innings 
Four wicket-keepers have taken seven dismissals in a single innings in a Test match—Wasim Bari of Pakistan in 1979, Englishman Bob Taylor in 1980, New Zealand's Ian Smith in 1991 and most recently West Indian gloveman Ridley Jacobs against Australia in 2000.

The feat of taking 6 dismissals in an innings has been achieved by 24 wicket-keepers on 32 occasions including 4 Indians.

Most dismissals in a match 
Three wicket-keepers have made 11 dismissals in a Test match, Englishman Jack Russell in 1995, South African AB de Villiers in 2013 and most recently India's Rishabh Pant against Australia in 2018.

The feat of making 10 dismissals in a match has been achieved by 4 wicket-keepers on 4 occasions with Wriddhiman Saha being the only Indian.

Most dismissals in a series 
Brad Haddin holds the Test cricket record for the most dismissals taken by a wicket-keeper in a series. He took 29 catches during the 2013 Ashes series. Indian record is held by Rishabh Pant when he made 20 dismissals during the Border Gavaskar Trophy in Australia in 2018.

Fielding records

Most career catches 

 
Caught is one of the nine methods a batsman can be dismissed in cricket.  The majority of catches are caught in the slips, located behind the batsman, next to the wicket-keeper, on the off side of the field. Most slip fielders are top order batsmen.

India's Rahul Dravid holds the record for the most catches in Test cricket by a non-wicket-keeper with 209, followed by Mahela Jayawardene of Sri Lanka on 205 and South African Jacques Kallis with 200. Ricky Ponting is the highest ranked Australian in fourth, securing 196 catches in his Test career.

Most catches in a series 
The 1920–21 Ashes series, in which Australia whitewashed England 5–0 for the first time, saw the record set for the most catches taken by a non-wicket-keeper in a Test series. Australian all-rounder Jack Gregory took 15 catches in the series as well as 23 wickets. Greg Chappell, a fellow Australian all-rounder, and India's KL Rahul are equal second behind Gregory with 14 catches taken during the 1974–75 Ashes series and during the 2018 Indian tour of England respectively. Four players have taken 13 catches in a series on six occasions with both Bob Simpson and Brian Lara having done so twice and Rahul Dravid and Alastair Cook once.

All-round Records

1000 runs and 100 wickets 
A total of 71 players have achieved the double of 1000 runs and 100 wickets in their Test career.

250 runs and 20 wickets in a series 
A total of 18 players on 24 occasions have achieved the double of 250 runs and 20 wickets in a series.

Other records

Most career matches 

India's Sachin Tendulkar holds the record for the most Test matches played with 200, with former captains Ricky Ponting and Steve Waugh being joint second with each having represented Australia on 168 occasions.

Most consecutive career matches 
Former English captain Alastair Cook holds the record for the most consecutive Test matches played with 159. He broke Allan Border's long standing record of 153 matches in June 2018. Sunil Gavaskar, the Indian opener played 106 consecutive Test matches, is fourth. The recently retired New Zealand wicket-keeper-batsman Brendon McCullum, who is fifth on the list with 101 matches, is the highest ranked cricketer who never missed a Test match during his playing career. Rahul Dravid, in ninth on 93, is the highest ranked Indian player to achieve the feat.

Most matches as captain 

Graeme Smith, who led the South African cricket team from 2003 to 2014, holds the record for the most matches played as captain in Test cricket with 109. Virat Kohli who led the side for seven years from 2014 to 2022 is sixth on the list with 68 matches.

Most wins as captain 

Graeme Smith, who led the South African cricket team from 2003 to 2014, holds the record for the most wins as captain in Test cricket with 53.

Most man of the match awards

Most man of the series awards

Youngest players on Debut 
The youngest player to play in a Test match is claimed to be Hasan Raza at the age of 14 years and 227 days. Making his debut for Pakistan against Zimbabwe on 24 October 1996, there is some doubt as to the validity of Raza's age at the time. The youngest Indian to play Test cricket was Sachin Tendulkar who at the age of 16 years and 205 days debuted in the first Test of the series against Pakistan in November 1989.

Oldest players on Debut 
England left-arm slow bowler James Southerton is the oldest player to appear in a Test match. Playing in the very first inaugural test against Australia in 1876 at Melbourne Cricket Ground, in Melbourne, Australia, he was aged 49 years and 119 days. Rustomji Jamshedji is the oldest Indian Test debutant when he played his only game during the first Test of the 1933–34 series at the Bombay Gymkhana.

Oldest players 
England all-rounder Wilfred Rhodes is the oldest player to appear in a Test match. Playing in the fourth Test against the West Indies in 1930 at Sabina Park, in Kingston, Jamaica, he was aged 52 years and 165 days on the final day's play. The oldest Indian Test player is Vinoo Mankad who was aged 41years and 300 days when he represented India for the final time in the fifth Test of the 1959 tour by West Indies at the Arun Jaitley Stadium, then known as Feroze Shah Kotla Stadium.

Partnership records
In cricket, two batsmen are always present at the crease batting together in a partnership. This partnership will continue until one of them is dismissed, retires or the innings comes to a close.

Highest partnerships by wicket
A wicket partnership describes the number of runs scored before each wicket falls. The first wicket partnership is between the opening batsmen and continues until the first wicket falls. The second wicket partnership then commences between the not out batsman and the number three batsman. This partnership continues until the second wicket falls. The third wicket partnership then commences between the not out batsman and the new batsman. This continues down to the tenth wicket partnership. When the tenth wicket has fallen, there is no batsman left to partner so the innings is closed.

Highest partnerships by runs
The highest Test partnership by runs for any wicket is held by the Sri Lankan pairing of Kumar Sangakkara and Mahela Jayawardene who put together a third wicket partnership of 624 runs during the first Test against South Africa in July 2006. This broke the record of 576 runs set by their compatriots Sanath Jayasuriya and Roshan Mahanama against India in 1997. India's Vinoo Mankad and Pankaj Roy hold the 12th highest Test partnership with 413 made in 1956 against New Zealand.

Highest overall partnership runs by a pair

Umpiring records

Most matches umpired
An umpire in cricket is a person who officiates the match according to the Laws of Cricket. Two umpires adjudicate the match on the field, whilst a third umpire has access to video replays, and a fourth umpire looks after the match balls and other duties. The records below are only for on-field umpires.

Aleem Dar of Pakistan holds the record for the most Test matches umpired with 130. The current active Dar set the record in December 2019 overtaking Steve Bucknor from the West Indies mark of 128 matches. They are followed by South Africa's Rudi Koertzen who officiated in 108. The most experienced Indian is Srinivas Venkataraghavan who is tenth on the list with 73 Test matches umpired.

See also

List of Test cricket records
List of India One Day International cricket records
List of India Twenty20 International records

Notes

References

India
Lists of Indian cricket records and statistics